Mends is a surname. Notable people with the surname include:

Bright Middleton Mends (born 1992), Ghanaian footballer
Christopher Mends (1724–1799), Welsh Methodist minister
Edward Ebo Mends (born 2000), Ghanaian footballer
Esme Mends (born 1986), Ghanaian footballer
Frank Mends Stone (1857–1942), Australian lawyer and politician
Robert Mends (c. 1767–1823), British Royal Navy officer
T. D. Brodie-Mends (1929–2013), Ghanaian journalist, lawyer and politician
William Robert Mends (1812–1897), British admiral of the Royal Navy
Samuel O. Mends (1986), A network administrator based in NJ, USA

See also 
Mends Street Jetty, is located in South Perth in Western Australia.
Nüwa Mends the Heavens, is a well-known theme in Chinese culture